Noeasy is the second studio album to be recorded by South Korean boy group Stray Kids. It was released on August 23, 2021, through JYP Entertainment, nine months after its predecessor the Japanese-language extended play (EP) All In (2020), and eleven months after the Korean reissue In Life (2020). The album's title is a wordplay on "noisy" and "no easy", and conveys the idea of the group making a loud impact on the world with their music.

For the album, 3Racha (Bang Chan, Changbin, and Han), an in-house production team consisting of members of Stray Kids, worked with songwriters and producers including Versachoi, HotSauce, Hong Ji-sang, Krysta Youngs, and the group's other members. The fourteen-track album spans the musical genres  hip hop, EDM, pop, R&B, and rock, and includes the lead single "Thunderous", and earlier releases "Wolfgang" and "Mixtape: Oh".

Upon its release, Noeasy received favorable reviews for its creativity, storytelling, themes, and energy. The album peaked at number one on the Gaon Album Chart, and in the top 20 of album charts in Australia, Austria, Belgium, Denmark, Finland, Hungary, Japan, the Netherlands, Poland, and Switzerland. Over 1.3 million copies of Noeasy were sold in 2021 and the Korea Music Content Association (KMCA) certified it a million-seller, acknowledging it as the first million-selling album for the group and their label. Noeasy won Best Album (Bonsang) at the 36th Golden Disc Awards.

Background

Stray Kids uploaded the video "Step Out 2021", which describes the group's accomplishments in 2020 and plans for 2021—including a second studio album—.through their social media channels on January 1, 2021. Between April and June of that year, the group participated in the Mnet competitive reality television show Kingdom: Legendary War, in which they competed agains other similar groups and  emerged as the winner. During the program, they released the song "Wolfgang" on May 28, from the extended play (EP) [[Kingdom: Legendary War#Kingdom <Finale: Who Is the King?>|Kingdom <Final: Who Is the King?>]], as part of the final performance competition. This was followed by the single "Mixtape: Oh" on June 26 and the announcement Hyunjin would rejoin the group in July following a hiatus since late February.

On June 29, 2021, the South Korean news outlet SpoTV News reported the group would release an album in late August and hold Kingdom Week, a television-program benefit for the winner. Later, JYP Entertainment confirmed the group were preparing a new album but had not decided its format. Hyunjin would also participate in the new album's promotion. A month later, via the album trailer "Thunderous", the group announced their second studio album would be titled Noeasy and was scheduled for release on August 23, 2021, marking their first Korean physical release in 11 months.

Before the album announcement, in early July, Stray Kids released SKZ Camp Song: Howl in Harmony, a five-episode camp-type online program that documents the group's song-creation process and the making of music videos for them. They group were separated into three teams: Quokka Bbang Daengi (Han, Seungmin, I.N; formerly Margarine Bbang) to write the song "Gone Away"; Yeoreum Wangja (Lee Know, Changbin, Felix) for "Surfin'"; and Bekka Wang (Bang Chan, Hyunjin) for "Red Lights". In early April, the group also teased the B-side "Sorry, I Love You" on their V Live's live-streaming content Chan's Room, and "The View" was teased as a title on the music video of "Mixtape: Oh" in late June.

Title and concept

The album's title, Noeasy, is a wordplay on "noisy"—describing the misconception of the group's music as "noise music"— and "no easy", reflecting the highs and lows of life. According to Bang Chan; "We [Stray Kids] actually thought the term 'noise music' was something that we could use as our own weapon".

Both interpretations express that despite the group's hardships, they aim to be the noisiest group. Bang Chan, the group leader, told several South Korean news outlets; "[Noeasy] means that we want to leave a loud impact on the world with our music". Seungmin said; "the meaning (of Noeasy) is something like, 'life is not easy because of the naggers who tell us to do this and that, but we are Stray Kids, and we are not backing down' ... "

Music and lyrics

Noeasy is forty-six minutes and thirty-five seconds long, and has fourteen tracks of various music genres. The album's first four tracks are described as hip hop and EDM songs with aggressive bass sounds to represent fighting, and to mock the group's critics and haters. Tracks five through nine are "emotional" songs with pop, rock, and R&B sounds. The album concludes with three sub-unit songs and two previously released songs. All of the tracks were produced and mostly written by Bang Chan, Changbin, and Han, who work together as the group's production team 3Racha. Other group members also participated in song writing; Lee Know and Felix co-wrote "Surfin'", Hyunjin co-wrote "Red Lights", and Seungmin and I.N co-wrote "Gone Away". Several other Korean and foreign songwriter-producers, including Versachoi, HotSauce, Hong Ji-sang, and Krysta Youngs, also contributed to the album.

Songs

Noeasy opens with "Cheese", an EDM track with a "strong" rock] sound, "cheerful" energy, and "rough" bass synth, which uses the word "cheese" as a wordplay to compare smiling with a variety of cheeses. The lyrics include a flippant response to the group's critics. "Thunderous", the second track and the album's lead single, is a hip-hop and trap song that includes elements of Korean traditional music (gugak), brass instruments, and chuimsae. The song expresses the conviction the group will not be discouraged and will maintain their principles despite criticism. The Korean title "Sori-kkun" has a dual meaning of jansori-kkun meaning "nagger", and sori-kkun meaning "(pansori) singer".

The hip-hop-influenced third track "Domino" begins with a doorbell sound, alluding to the pizza brand; the song also has "intense" beats, "distinctive" sounds, and high-pitched taepyeongso. It compares the group's ambition and confidence to a game of dominoes. The lyrics imply the group's actions encourage other to follow after them in a domino effect. "Ssick", the fourth track, is a mid-tempo hip-hop and EDM song whose title has the dual meaning of "sick", which in English is slang for "good", and the Korean word ssik, which means "grin smile". It references the influence of fame and its attraction, and conveys the message feeling special about oneself is enough.

"The View", the fifth track, is described as a "rhythmic", "summery", and "hopeful healing", upbeat, synth-pop track. The song is based on an EDM sound; its lyrics are about  winning over past difficulties and future uncertainties while feeling refreshed and optimistic. "Sorry, I Love You", the mid-tempo R&B sixth track expresses a feeling of guilt and regret for liking someone and potentially ruining a friendship. The seventh track "Silent Cry" is an alternative rock song about two people who cannot see each other's pain, and offers comfort to the silent, world-weary soul. The eighth track "Secret Secret" is a slow-tempo R&B song that conveys comfort and sympathy with the narrator wanting to tell their secrets to rain. "Star Lost", the dance-pop, soft rock ninth track, is a "feel-good" song with a nostalgic compositionthat calls on fans who feel alone to believe in themselves.

The upbeat, alternative R&B tenth track was performed by Bang Chan and Hyunjin; "Red Lights" features a "wild" feeling created by "violent" string sounds and electric guitar, giving it a "ripened sexy charm". Its lyrics use the theme of continuing to love someone despite having concerns and suffering, and talk about an unhealthy obsession with work. The summer-vibe, upbeat, dance-pop eleventh track "Surfin'" which is sung by Lee Know, Changbin, Felix, is described as "like a glass of carbonated water" with tropical sounds and marimba beats and lyrics about how having occasional little adventures can heal the soul and mind, allowing one to keep one's lives on track and not solely focus on work. "Gone Away", the twelfth track, is a ballad that describes an unrequited love and the frustration of someone who cannot to be with their lover; it is sung by Han, Seungmin, and I.N.

"Wolfgang", the hip-hop thirteenth track, describes a wolf pack making music by following Wolfgang Amadeus Mozart, and compares Stray Kids to the pack-hunting behavior of wolves. It was intended to convey a cohesive and solid appearance, and unstoppable will to pursue a goal. The album concludes with  "Mixtape: Oh", a mid-tempo electropop song from the Mixtape Project; it has a reggaeton rhythm that describes the frustration of being clumsy and immature in front of the object of one's desire, and expresses feelings of resentment and frustration at those feelings.

Release

Stray Kids released Noeasy on August 23, 2021, on CD in both limited-edition and standard versions and download, and on streaming platforms. A jewel case version of the album was released on August 30, one week after the official release date. Previewing and pre-orders for the limited-edition version began on July 22, concurrent with the trailer release, the two standard versions began one week later, and the jewel case version began on the day after the release date.

The album's limited and standard editions contain a CD-R, a package sleeve, a photobook, a lyrics book, a randomized member sticker, a folded poster, photo cards, and a double-sided photo card. The jewel case version, which features a member's solo cover, contains a CD-R, a sticker, and a randomized photo card. The limited version exclusively includes a randomized pop-up card and an all-member photo card set. A randomized poster, a frame photo card, and a special mini photo book are available through pre-order.

Promotion

On July 22, 2021, Stray Kids released a two-and-half-minute-long official comeback trailer named "Thunderous" and announced their second studio album Noeasy was scheduled for release on August 23. The trailer was directed by Lee Hye-sung and produced by Sushivisual; it has a superhero theme and shows the members transforming into avenger corps against the ear-shaped "sound monster" by inventing technology and weapons, and brainstorming strategies in an apocalyptic world. On August 2, they released an exclusive clip with behind-the-scenes footage of the trailer. In the clip, the members tease the undisclosed lead single; Felix appears alone and greets the group's fans.

The group released snippet videos for the eight of the twelve tracks: "Cheese", "Red Lights", "Gone Away", "Surfin'", "Domino", "Sorry, I Love You", "The View", and "Secret Secret". The teaser images were uploaded in three sets. The first concept shows a red avant-garde outfit with a smoky background. The second depicts a black-and-white outfit with plain white or hanok background. The third shows pastel-colored casual outfits surrounded by neon lights.

The complete track list of Noeasy was announced on August 12, 2021, with "Thunderous" as the album's lead single, and the previous releases "Wolfgang" and "Mixtape: Oh". Two music-video teasers of"Thunderous" were released on August 20 and 21, and the performance-video teaser with SKZoo's costumes was released the following day. The online cover artwork, and the 24-minute-long documentary video Intro: "Noeasy" introducing the album, were also released with the album on August 23. To promote the album, the group held an online listening party via Stationhead on August 27 (KST), and appeared on several television and radio programs, including domestic music programs, Weekly Idol, After School Club, Day6's Kiss the Radio, and Cultwo Show. In addition to the lead single, the accompanying music videos for B-sides "The View", "Cheese", "Red Lights", "Surfin'", and "Gone Away", and live videos for "Sorry I Love You" and "Secret Secret" were also released.

Kingdom Week <No+>

Stray Kids appeared on Kingdom Week <No+>, a television variety show that benefits the winner of Kingdom: Legendary War, which aired on Mnet for seven episodes from August 17 to 23. The first and second episodes showed the group behind the scenes during Kingdom: Legendary War, with commentary by Felix and Seungmin. In the third, fourth, and fifth episodes, the members go to a villa to rest and play a game called "buddy catcher". The sixth episode includes the group's best performance chosen by the group members. The final episode, airing the day as the album's release, called Stray Kids Comeback Show "Noeasy", showcases the album.

Singles

"Thunderous" is the lead single from Noeasy. It was accompanied by a music video that was directed by Bang Jae-yeob, and posted to YouTube, Naver TV, and V Live. Both the single and the video were released alongside the album on August 23, 2021. "Thunderous" peaked at number thirty-three on South Korea's Gaon Digital Chart, number three on the US World Digital Song Sales, and number eighty on the Billboard Global 200, and took six wins from music programs: twice on Show Champion, twice on M Countdown, once on Music Bank, and once on Inkigayo. The accompanying music video reached 50 million views on YouTube in six days of release and 100 million views in fifty-five days, making it the group's fastest and fifth 100-million-view music video.

Live performances

Stray Kids gave the debut performance of Noeasy with a showcase, called Stray Kids Comeback Show "Noeasy", which was held on the day as the album's release as part of the final episode of Kingdom Week <No+>. The group performed the lead single "Thunderous", and the B-side "The View" for the first time at the show, alongside the show's final competition song "Wolfgang", and "Grow Up" from their debut EP I Am Not (2018). The group promoted "Thunderous" on South Korean music programs M Countdown, Music Bank, Show! Music Core, Inkigayo, and Show Champion for three weeks, August 26 – September 12, along with "The View" in the first week of promotion, and "Secret Secret" at Show! Music Core on September 4. "Domino" was also promoted and performed during September 24–26 on Music Bank, Show! Music Core, and Inkigayo. "Sorry, I Love You" was performed for the first time at Unite On: Live Concert on November 6.

Stray Kids also performed songs from Noeasy at several awards ceremonies and year-end annual music shows. The group gave the debut performances of the sub-unit tracks "Red Lights", "Surfin'", and "Gone Away" as a medley alongside "Thunderous" at the 2021 The Fact Music Awards on October 2. They performed "Domino" and "Thunderous", and also showed Lee Know's solo dance performance and 3Racha's rap performance, at the 2021 Asia Artist Awards on December 2. "Cheese" was given its debut performance on December 11 at the 2021 Mnet Asian Music Awards as part of medley titled Stray Kids World Domination, alongside the "hero" version of "Thunderous" and the unreleased song "Hey, Monster", whis was performed by 3Racha. The group performed "Thunderous" with a new arrangement at the 36th Golden Disc Awards on January 8, 2022, alongside "Top" and "Wolfgang".

The group performed  "Thunderous" at the 2021 KBS Song Festival on December 17 at Namhansanseong; the performance was described as a "mega performance" and "action movie-like feeling". They performed the Christmas version of "Thunderous" at 2021 SBS Gayo Daejeon on December 25, using canes and group dance, and parodying Squid Game ttakji, and dalgona game, alongside "Winter Falls" from the single album Christmas EveL, and covered IU's "Merry Christmas Ahead", performed by the members Changbin, Han, Felix, Seungmin, and I.N, as part of Christmas carol medley with other artists. They closed the year with a performance of "Thunderous" at 2021 MBC Gayo Daejejeon on December 31, adding the ringing of a New Year's bell before the New Year ceremony.

As an ambassador for the Korea Pavilion of Expo 2020 in Dubai, United Arab Emirates, Stray Kids performed "Thunderous" as part of the opening show of the Korea Pavilion's Korea National Day with the Little Angels and K-Tigers on January 17, 2022. The group also performed "Thunderous" alongside "Miroh", "God's Menu", and "Back Door" at the Korea National Day K-Pop Concert on the same day. The debut performance of "Silent Cry" was given at the group's second fan meeting on February 12 and 13 at Olympic Hall.

Critical reception

Upon its release, Noeasy received positive reviews from music critics. Writing for Rolling Stone India, Divyansha Dongre said Stray Kids "keeps their identity intact as they reflect on hate directed towards their artistry", which is "centered around a powerful message of self-expression". Tamar Herman from South China Morning Post said the album "offers a lot of different styles to suit listeners and finds its strength in the group's creativity and storytelling", and that "Stray Kids have grown with each release". Writing for Pinkvilla, Ayushi Agrawal considered the album a "a book that can only be penned by Stray Kids" and said the album "reinstated their tag of 'self-producing idols' in a way that is above and beyond any expectations", and that it "reaffirms the group's self-made mighty footing in the music industry". Ruby C writing for NME rated the album four stars out of five, and described the album as both claps of thunder and gradually subsiding storms, and "filled with depth, creative substance and a whole repertoire of 'noise' to boot".

Chu Seung-hyun from Seoul Economy Daily wrote Noeasy is "full of unique bold and energetic appearance". Crystal Bell of Teen Vogue described the album as "more than noise", and complimented the group, saying they were able to "perfect their ability to make even the quiet parts unabashedly loud, showing us how to live with the noise—not run away from it". The Lantern writer Chloe McGowan gave the album a score of 4.5 out of 5, and said it features "fast-paced chart-toppers", "sultry anthems", "serotonin-boosting bops", and "heartbreaking ballads", all "incredibly on-brand" for the self-produced idol group. McGowan also said; "Stray Kids fully utilizes the individual talent of each member on this album as they continue to push boundaries and expectations for K-pop while testing the limits and creative devices of their own sound." Molly Matthews, a music critic from Redbrick, gave the album full-score ratings, and described it as "jaw-dropping" and "jam-packed" with "energy, emotions, and charisma". She also said every part of Noeasy "drips in gold" from lyrics, vocals, and rap to instrumentals.

Year-end lists

Awards and nominations

Commercial performance

On August 17, 2021, it was reported pre-orders of Noeasy had surpassed 830,000 copies; on the day of release, August 23, pre-orders had exceeded 930,000, breaking the group's previous record of 300,000 pre-orders for In Life. According to Hanteo Chart, Noeasy sold 355,946 copies on the first day, and 641,589 copies in the first week of release.

Upon its release, Noeasy debuted and peaked at number one on the thirty-fifth and thirty-sixth weeks of the South Korean Gaon Album Chart for the issue dates of August 22–28, and August 29–September 4, respectively, becoming the group's fifth number-one album on the chart after Clé 1: Miroh, Clé: Levanter, Go Live, and In Life. The album had sold 1,127,800 copies by the end of August, making it the group's first million-selling album, and that of their label, JYP Entertainment. It was also the sixth South Korean million-selling album of 2021. All of the album's fourteen tracks also simultaneously entered the Gaon Download Chart for the first time, all becoming top-40 hits. 
Noeasy received a million certification by Korea Music Content Association (KMCA) on October 7. Noeasy ranked at number eight on the 2021 year-end Gaon Album Chart, selling 1,303,106 copies as of the end of the year.

In Japan, Noeasy peaked at number two on the Oricon Albums Chart, and at number twenty-one on Billboard Japan Hot Albums. In the United States, the album entered the Billboard Heatseekers Album at number four, World Albums at number five, Independent Albums at number thirty-eight, and Top Current Album Sales at number sixty-nine for the chart issue date of September 4, 2021. Its tracks "Cheese", "Thunderous", "Domino", "Ssick", "The View", "Sorry, I Love You", "Red Lights", and "Wolfgang" simultaneously  charted in the top 25 in the World Digital Song Sales. The album entered several national charts in Australia (fourteen), Austria (twelve), Belgium (both Flanders (thirteen), and Wallonia (five)), Croatia (thirty-four), Denmark (three), Finland (five), Germany (sixty-four), Hungary (five), Lithuania (twenty-two), the Netherlands (eighteen), Norway (twenty-seven), Poland (six), Spain (sixty-seven), and Switzerland (ten). It additionally entered the component charts of French Physical Albums (sixty-three), Swedish Physical Albums (ten), and the UK Album Downloads (twenty-six).

Track listing

Notes
 "Mixtape: Oh" is stylized as "Mixtape : OH".
 Track titles in Korean translation:
 Track 2 "" means "singer" of Korean traditional music storytelling pansori, and a play with the Korean word "noise" and the suffix , an indicator that a thing is someone's profession or hobby.
 Track 4 "" means "grin smile" and play with the word "sick".
 Track 6 "" means as same as the English title.
 Track 8 "" means "a secret that can't be told".
 Track 10 "" means "compulsion" or "obsession".
 Track 14 "" means "love" or "child".

Credits and personnel

Musicians

 Stray Kids
 Bang Chan (3Racha) – lead vocals , background vocals , lyrics , composition , arrangement , instrumentation 
 Changbin (3Racha) – lead vocals , background vocals , lyrics , composition 
 Han (3Racha) – lead vocals , background vocals , lyrics , composition , vocal directing 
 Lee Know – lead vocals , background vocals , lyrics , composition 
 Hyunjin – lead vocals , background vocals , lyrics , composition 
 Felix – lead vocals , background vocals , lyrics , composition 
 Seungmin – lead vocals , background vocals , lyrics , composition 
 I.N – lead vocals , background vocals , lyrics , composition 
 Versachoi – composition , arrangement , instrumentation 
 HotSauce – composition , arrangement , keyboard , drum programming , computer programming 
 ByHVN (153/Joombas) – composition , arrangement , keyboard , drum , bass 
 Krysta Youngs – lyrics , composition , background vocals 
 Telykast – composition , arrangement , instrumentation , drums , keyboard , computer programming 
 Millionboy – composition , arrangement , instrumentation 
 Hong Ji-sang – composition , arrangement , background vocals , electric guitar , bass , keyboard , computer programming 
 JinbyJin – composition , arrangement , guitar , piano , synthesizer , computer programming , vocal directing 
 Moa "Cazzi Opeia" Carlebecker – composition 
 Gabriel Brandes – composition 
 Earattack – lyrics , composition , arrangement , background vocals , instrumentation 
 Callous – lyrics 
 DaviDior – composition , arrangement , instrumentation 
 Nickko Young – guitar 
 Armadillo – composition , arrangement , instrumentation 
 Gump – composition , arrangement , instrumentation 
 Jung So-ri – guitar 
 Jeon Sang-min – piano 
 Yi Sung-chan – bass 
 Holy M – composition , arrangement , bass , computer programming 
 Kobee – composition , arrangement , guitar , drum , computer programming 

Technical

 KayOne Lee – digital editing 
 HotSauce – digital editing 
 Lee Hwa-shin – digital editing 
 Jung Yu-ra – digital editing 
 Woo Min-jung – digital editing 
 Lee Sang-yeop – recording 
 Lim Hong-jin – recording 
 Goo Hye-jin – recording 
 Eom Se-hee – recording 
 Hong Ji-sang – recording 
 Park Eun-jung – recording , mixing 
 Bang Chan (3Racha) – recording 
 Choi Hye-jin – recording , mixing 
 Yoon Won-kwon – mixing 
 Tony Maserati – mixing 
 Master Key – mixing 
 Jay-P Gu – mixing 
 Shin Bong-won – mixing 
 Lee Tae-sub – mixing 
 David K. Younghyun – mix engineering 
 Kang Seo-yeon – mix engineering 
 Kwon Nam-woo – mastering 
 Chris Gehringer – mastering 
 Will Quinnell – mastering assistant 

Others

 J.Y. Park "The Asiansoul" – executive producer
 Jimmy Jeong – executive producer
 Bang Jae-yeob – video production, director
 Jung Min-hee (Mu: Creative) – photographer
 Kim Chan (Prod) – photographer
 Jay – hair/makeup director
 Seo Ji-hye – hair/makeup director
 Jung Min-ju – hair/makeup director
 Jeon Ji-won – hair/makeup director
 Park Jung-ah – style director
 Lee So-young – style director
 Ahn Yu-na – style director
 Hyun Seung-jae (Zesstype) – album logo design
 Laundry Office – album design

Locations

 JYP Publishing (KOMCA) – original publishing , sub-publishing 
 153/Joombas Music Publishing – original publishing 
 Trevor Klaiman Music (BMI) – original publishing 
 Kyle M T Music (ASCAP) – original publishing 
 Linus AK Music (ASCAP) – original publishing 
 Petal Rock Publishing (ASCAP) – original publishing 
 Copyright Control – original publishing , sub-publishing 
 EKKO Music Rights Europe (powered by CTGA) – original publishing , sub-publishing 
 Fujipacific Music Korea Inc. – sub-publishing 
 JYPE Studios – recording , mixing 
 Jisang's Studio – recording 
 Channie's Room – recording 
 Studio DDeepKick – mixing 
 Chapel Swing Studios (Valley Glen) – mixing 
 821 Sound – mixing , mastering 
 Klang Studio – mixing 
 Glab Studios – mixing 
 Sterling Sound – mastering

Charts

Weekly charts

Monthly charts

Year-end charts

Certifications and sales

Release history

See also

 List of best-selling albums in South Korea
 List of Gaon Album Chart number ones of 2021

Footnotes

References

2021 albums
JYP Entertainment albums
Korean-language albums
Stray Kids albums